Šid is a town and municipality located in the Srem District of the autonomous province of Vojvodina, Serbia. It has a population of 14,893, while the municipality has 34,188 inhabitants. A border crossing between Serbia and Croatia is located in the town.

Name
In Serbian, the town is known as Šid (Шид), in Hungarian as Sid, in German as Schid, in Slovak as Šíd, and in Rusyn as Шид.

History
Šid was firstly mentioned in 1702. At first, settlement was part of Danubian Military Frontier, but since the middle of the 18th century, it was part of the Syrmia County of the Habsburg Kingdom of Slavonia. In 1848-1849, Šid was part of Serbian Vojvodina, and in 1849-1860 part of Voivodeship of Serbia and Banat of Temeschwar. After the abolishment of the voivodeship in 1860, Šid was again incorporated into Syrmia County of the Kingdom of Slavonia. 

In 1868, Kingdom of Slavonia was joined with the Kingdom of Croatia into the Kingdom of Croatia-Slavonia, which was part of the Kingdom of Hungary and Austria-Hungary. Šid was a district center within Syrmia County. In 1910, ethnic Serbs were in absolute majority in the town, while other sizable ethnic groups included Rusyns, Slovaks and Croats.

In 1918, the town first became part of the State of Slovenes, Croats and Serbs, then part of the Kingdom of Serbia and finally part of the Kingdom of Serbs, Croats and Slovenes. From 1918 to 1922, Šid was part of the Syrmia county, from 1922 to 1929 part of the Syrmia oblast, from 1929 to 1931 part of the Drina Banovina, from 1931 to 1939 part of the Danube Banovina, and from 1939 to 1941 part of the Banovina of Croatia.
 
During World War II, from 1941 to 1944, the town was occupied by Axis troops and was included into the Pavelić's Independent State of Croatia. The fascist Ustashe regime systematically murdered Serbs (as part of the Genocide of the Serbs), Jews (The Holocaust), Roma (The Porajmos), and some political dissidents. In August 1942, following the joint military anti-partisan operation in the Syrmia by the Ustashe and German Wehrmacht, it turned into a massacre by the Ustasha militia that left up to 7,000 Serbs dead. 

Among those killed was the prominent painter Sava Šumanović, who was arrested along with 150 residents of Šid. In 1944, Šid was liberated by Yugoslav Partisans and until April 1945, a number of battles of the Syrmian Front campaign were fought near the town. The Yugoslav Partisans mined the local Catholic church during the offensive in late 1944. 

Since 1944, the town is part of Vojvodina, which (from 1945) was an autonomous province of Serbia and Yugoslavia. On 5 November 1991, the Serbian government accused Croatian forces of firing 15 artillery rockets into the city, killing four people and wounding 12 in what became the first attack on Serbian soil during the Yugoslav Wars. In 2009, Šid was declared mine-free after demining actions to remove explosives dating from the conflict.

Inhabited places

The municipality of Šid encompasses of town of Šid, and the following villages:
Adaševci
Batrovci
Bačinci
Berkasovo
Bikić Do
Bingula
Vašica
Višnjićevo
Gibarac
Erdevik
Ilinci
Jamena
Kukujevci
Ljuba
Molovin
Morović
Privina Glava
Sot

Demographics

According to the 2011 census results, the municipality of Šid has 34,188 inhabitants.

Ethnic groups
Most of the settlements in the municipality have an ethnic Serb majority. The settlement with Slovak ethnic majority is Ljuba. Ethnically mixed settlements are Bikić Do (with relative Rusyn majority) and Sot (with relative Serb majority).

The ethnic composition of the municipality:

Culture
Near the Privina Glava village is Privina Glava Monastery. According to the legend, the monastery was founded by the squire Priva in the 12th century.

A museum dedicated to an important Serbian artist Sava Šumanović, and a museum of naïve art "Ilijanum" consisting of more than 300 works of fine art, is located in the municipality.

Economy
The following table gives a preview of total number of registered people employed in legal entities per their core activity (as of 2018):

Twin towns – sister cities
There are three official sister cities of Šid:
  Genoa, Italy
  Andorra la Vella, Andorra
  Kitee, Finland

Notable people
Mira Banjac
Željko Fajfrić
Georgije Magarašević
Bojan Milanović
Grozdana Olujić
Boško Simonović
Sava Šumanović

See also
 Syrmia District
 Syrmia
 Šid railway station

References

External links

 Official Site of Šid 
 Russian Castle 
 Šidski portal 

 
Populated places in Srem District
Municipalities and cities of Vojvodina
Towns in Serbia